The Michael Sweetser House is a historic house at 15 Nahant Street in Wakefield, Massachusetts.  The -story timber-frame house was built c. 1755 by Michael Sweetser, an early settler of the area.  It is traditionally Georgian in character, although its front door surround was added during Greek Revival period of the mid 19th century.  One of the house's 19th century occupants was Paul Hart Sweetser, one of the founders of the Massachusetts Teachers Association and a locally active politician.

The house was listed on the National Register of Historic Places in 1989.

See also
National Register of Historic Places listings in Wakefield, Massachusetts
National Register of Historic Places listings in Middlesex County, Massachusetts

References

Houses completed in 1755
Houses on the National Register of Historic Places in Wakefield, Massachusetts
Georgian architecture in Massachusetts
Houses in Wakefield, Massachusetts
Greek Revival architecture in Massachusetts